Vallis (plural Valles) is Latin for valley, vale; it may refer to the following :

Places and jurisdictions on Earth
 the Swiss canton Wallis
 Vallis (see), an ancient city, former bishopric and Latin Catholic titular see in Africa Proconsularis
 Vallis Vale in Somerset

Astronomy
 Vallis (planetary geology)
 Vallis Alpes on the Moon
 Vallis Rheita on the Moon
 Vallis Snellius on the Moon
 Valles Marineris on Mars

See also 
 Valles (disambiguation)